Devil's Head Resort is a golf, meeting/convention, and ski resort located in the Town of Merrimac in Sauk County, Wisconsin, near Devil's Lake State Park.

Description 

Its runs face mostly south, overlooking the Wisconsin River. They range from very gentle to fairly challenging. There is also a range of terrain park difficulty; one moderately sloped area has low rails and boxes, another has higher jumps, rails, and boxes on a steeper slope, and a third has large jumps. There is no glade skiing or backcountry skiing. 

Two 18-hole golf courses operate during the summer and there are mountain biking trails. 

Two hotel facilities are operated by the resort, one in the central lodge complex and one 6-story high-rise near the east side of the ski runs.

References

External links
 Devil's Head Resort official website

Buildings and structures in Sauk County, Wisconsin
Ski areas and resorts in Wisconsin
Tourist attractions in Sauk County, Wisconsin